Mordellistena aequalis is a species of beetle in the genus Mordellistena of the family Mordellidae. It was discovered in 1882.

References

aequalis
Beetles described in 1882